The Proslogion is a prayer (or meditation), written by the medieval cleric Saint Anselm of Canterbury in 1077–1078, serving to reflect on the attributes of God in order to explain how God can possess seemingly contradictory qualities. This meditation is considered to be the first-known philosophical formulation that sets out the ontological argument for the existence of God.

The original title for this discourse was to be Faith Seeking Understanding.

The ontological argument
The Proslogion marked what would be the beginning of Saint Anselm's famous and highly controversial ontological arguments for the existence of God. The first and most famous argument of his can be found at the end of chapter 2, followed by his second argument shortly after. While opinions concerning Anselm's twin ontological arguments widely differ—and have differed since the Proslogion was first conceived—there is a general consensus that the argument is most convincing to Anselm's intended audience, i.e. Christian believers who seek a rational basis for their belief in God.

First argument 
There are various reconstructions of Anselm's first argument, such as Dr. Scott H. Moore's analyses, for example:

Proposition 1: God is a being than which none greater can be conceived.
Proposition 2: If existence in reality is greater than existence in the mind alone, an imagined being who exists only in our mind is not a "being than which none greater can be conceived." A being than which none greater can be conceived must also exist in reality, where failure to do so would be a failure to be such.
Conclusion: Thus a being than which none greater can be conceived must exist, and we call this being God.
'because it is greater to exist in reality than in the mind only, the being that nothing greater than can be thought of will both in the mind and in reality.
 Objection 
Philosopher Immanuel Kant gave an objection to the argument, although it would be toward ontological arguments in general, rather than at Anselm specifically. In fact, it is actually unclear as to whether Kant had Anselm in mind at all. Kant's objection famously states that "existence is not a predicate." If Kant were considering Anselm's work in his analysis, he certainly left it up to the reader to grasp the applicability of the objection. One possible interpretation is to say that, because existence is not a predicate, a being that exists could not be said to be greater than one that does not exist; they would be equal.

 Second argument 
Just as the first, Anselm's second ontological argument can be formulated in numerous ways. Viney, for instance, renders the second argument as follows:

 "God" means "that than which nothing greater can be conceived."
 The idea of God is not contradictory.
 That which can be thought of as not existing (a contingent being) is not as great as that which cannot be thought of as not existing (a necessary being).
 Therefore, to think of God as possibly not existing (as contingent) is not to think of the greatest conceivable being. It is a contradiction to think of the greatest conceivable being as nonexistent.
 Therefore, God exists.

Chapters

 CHAPTER I: Exhortation of the mind to the contemplation of God. Excerpt:

 CHAPTER II: That God Truly Exists 
 CHAPTER III: That God Cannot be Thought Not to Exist 
 CHAPTER IV: How the Fool Managed to Say in His Heart That Which Cannot be Thought
 CHAPTER V: That God is whatever it is better to be than not to be, and that existing through Himself alone He makes all other beings from nothing
 CHAPTER VI: How He is perceptive although He is not a body
 CHAPTER VII: How He is omnipotent although He cannot do many things
 CHAPTER VIII: How He is both merciful and impassible
 CHAPTER IX: How the all-just and supremely just One spares the wicked and justly has mercy on the wicked
 CHAPTER X: How He justly punishes and justly spares the wicked
 CHAPTER XI: How 'all the ways of the Lord are mercy and truth', and yet how 'the Lord is just in all His ways'
 CHAPTER XII: That God is the very life by which He lives and that the same holds for like attributes
 CHAPTER XIII: How He alone is limitless and eternal, although other spirits are also limitless and eternal
 CHAPTER XIV: How and why God is both seen and not seen by those seeking Him
 CHAPTER XV: How He is greater than can be thought
 CHAPTER XVI: That this is the 'inaccessible light' in which He 'dwells'
 CHAPTER XVII: That harmony, fragrance, sweetness, softness, and beauty are in God according to His own ineffable manner
 CHAPTER XVIII: That there are no parts in God or in His eternity which He is
 CHAPTER XIX: That He is not in place or time but all things are in Him
 CHAPTER XX: That He is before and beyond even all eternal things
 CHAPTER XXI: Whether this is the 'age of the age' or the 'ages of the ages'
 CHAPTER XXII: That He alone is what He is and who He is
 CHAPTER XXIII: That this good is equally Father and Son and Holy Spirit, and that this is the one necessary being which is altogether and wholly and solely good
 CHAPTER XXIV: A speculation as to what kind and how great this good is
 CHAPTER XXV: Which goods belong to those who enjoy this good and how great they are
 CHAPTER XXVI: Whether this is the 'fullness of joy' which the Lord promises

Editions
 St. Anselm. 1903 [1078]. "Exhortation of the mind to the contemplation of God." Ch. 1 in Proslogium (1926 reprint ed.), translated by S. N. Deane. Chicago: Open Court Publishing Company. – via Fordham University Center for Medieval Studies. Retrieved 21 May 2020.
 — 1962 [1078]. "Proslogion." In St. Anselm: Basic Writings, edited and translated by S. N. Deane. Chicago: Open Court. .
 — "Anselmus Cantuariensis Proslogion" (in Latin). The Latin Library''. Retrieved July 25, 2006.

References

11th-century Latin books
1070s books
Latin prose texts
11th-century Christian texts
Scholasticism
Philosophy of religion literature